Colonel Lewis Vivian Loyd DL (14 November 1852 – 21 September 1908) was a British  Conservative Party politician.

He was elected at the 1892 general election as the Member of Parliament (MP) for Chatham in Kent, but did not seek re-election in 1895, and did not stand for Parliament again.

He was married on 14 August 1879 to Lady Mary Sophia Hely Hutchinson (1854–1936), daughter of 4th Earl of Donoughmore, a writer and translator with whom he had three children: two sons and a daughter. From his father's second cousin Samuel Jones Loyd, 1st Baron Overstone (1796–1883) he inherited the manor of Withybrook, Wolvey in Warwickshire, and the estate passed on his death to his oldest son Lewis Richard Loyd.

References

External links 

1852 births
1908 deaths
Conservative Party (UK) MPs for English constituencies
UK MPs 1892–1895
Directors of the London and North Western Railway